Grigoria Pouliou (born 23 October 2000) is a Greek footballer who plays as a forward for A Division club PAOK FC and the Greece women's national team.

Club career
Pouliou has played for PAOK in Greece at the UEFA Women's Champions League.

International career
Pouliou capped for Greece at senior level during the UEFA Women's Euro 2022 qualifying.

International goals

Honours
Mesologgi 2008
 B Division (1): 2016/17

PAOK
 A Division (3): 2018/19, 2019/20, 2020/21

References

2000 births
Living people
Greek women's footballers
Women's association football forwards
PAOK FC (women) players
Greece women's international footballers